Enterosora  is a genus of ferns in the family Polypodiaceae, subfamily Grammitidoideae, according to the Pteridophyte Phylogeny Group classification of 2016 (PPG I). PPG I also recognizes the genus Zygophlebia, which more recent sources include in Enterosora. , many do not have formally published names in Enterosora and are retained here in Zygophlebia.

Taxonomy
The genus Enterosora was created by John Gilbert Baker in 1886 with the type species Enterosora campbellii. The genus Zygophlebia was created by L. Earl Bishop in 1989 with the type species Zygophlebia sectifrons, formerly placed in Polypodium.  Molecular phylogenetic studies have shown that Enterosora is nested within Zygophlebia, which could be resolved by synonymizing Zygophlebia with Enterosora. In 2016, the authors of the PPG I classification considered merging the genera to be premature. A further study was published in 2019. This showed that Enterosora s.s. was monophyletic, but embedded within two clades of Zyglophlebia, with Ceradenia the sister of Enterosora s.l.:

The Checklist of Ferns and Lycophytes of the World has recognized the merger of Zygophlebia into Enterosora. However, many former Zygophlebia species do not have formally published names in Enterosora, so are retained here Zygophlebia.

Species
, the Checklist of Ferns and Lycophytes of the World (CFLW) accepted the following species. Species placed in Zygophlebia but accepted in Enterosora by CFLW are listed separately.

Enterosora asplenioides L.E.Bishop
Enterosora barbatula (Baker) Parris
Enterosora bishopii A.Rojas
Enterosora campbelliii Baker
Enterosora ecostata (Sodiro) L.E.Bishop
Enterosora enterosoroides (Christ) A.Rojas
Enterosora insidiosa (Sloss.) L.E.Bishop
Enterosora percrassa (Baker) L.E.Bishop
Enterosora sinuata Rakotondr. & Parris
Enterosora trichosora (Hook.) L.E.Bishop
Enterosora trifurcata (L.) L.E.Bishop
Enterosora uluguruensis (Reimers) Rakotondr. & Parris

Many of the species placed in Zygophlebia in the PPG I system do not yet have published names in Enterosora and so have "comb. ined." in CFLW. All are retained here in Zygophlebia:

Enterosora anjanaharibensis (Rakotondr.) comb. ined. = Zygophlebia anjanaharibensis Rakotondr.
Enterosora cornuta (Lellinger) Shalisko & Sundue = Zygophlebia cornuta (Lellinger) L.E.Bishop
Enterosora devoluta (Baker) Shalisko & Sundue = Zygophlebia devoluta (Baker) Parris
Enterosora dudleyi (L.E.Bishop) comb. ined. = Zygophlebia dudleyi L.E.Bishop
Enterosora eminens (C.V.Morton) comb. ined. = Zygophlebia eminens (C.V.Morton) L.E.Bishop
Enterosora forsythiana (Baker) Shalisko & Sundue = Zygophlebia forsythiana (Baker) Parris
Enterosora goodmanii (Rakotondr.) Shalisko & Sundue = Zygophlebia goodmanii Rakotondr.
Enterosora humbertii (C.Chr.) Shalisko & Sundue = Zygophlebia humbertii (C.Chr.) Parris 
Enterosora longipilosa (C.Chr.) comb. ined. = Zygophlebia longipilosa (C.Chr.) L.E.Bishop
Enterosora major (Reimers) comb. ined. = Zygophlebia major (Reimers) Parris
Enterosora mathewsii (Kunze ex Mett.) Shalisko & Sundue = Zygophlebia matthewsii (Kunze ex Mett.) L.E.Bishop
Enterosora rouxii (Rakotondr. & Parris) comb. ined. = Zygophlebia rouxii Rakotondr. & Parris 
Enterosora sectifrons (Kunze ex Mett.) Shalisko & Sundue = Zygophlebia sectifrons (Kunze ex Mett.) L.E.Bishop
Enterosora subpinnata (Baker) Shalisko & Sundue = Zygophlebia subpinnata (Baker) L.E.Bishop ex Parris
Enterosora torulosa (Baker) Shalisko & Sundue = Zygophlebia torulosa (Baker) Parris
Enterosora villosissima (Hook.) Shalisko & Sundue = Zygophlebia villosissima (Hook.) L.E.Bishop
Enterosora werffii (L.E.Bishop) comb. ined. = Zygophlebia werffii L.E.Bishop

Distribution
When circumscribed to include Zygophlebia, the genus Enterosora is widely distributed in the Neotropics and tropical Africa, including Madagascar and the Mascarene Islands. The species which Bishop placed in Zygophlebia were mainly native to the Neotropics, with a few African species.

References

Polypodiaceae
Fern genera
Taxonomy articles created by Polbot